Zara Holland is a British television personality best known for taking part in reality show Love Island on ITV2. She formerly held the title of Miss Great Britain owned by CEO John Singh.

Life and career 
In June 2016 she took part in ITV2's Love Island; while on the show she went on a date with contestant Alex Bowen and had sex with him. She was subsequently stripped of her Miss Great Britain title, a decision that proved controversial.

In January 2021 Holland was arrested by police in Barbados and charged with breaching coronavirus laws during the COVID-19 pandemic. Holland was alleged to have breached a mandatory period of quarantine upon arrival to the country. On 6 January, she was found guilty and fined Bds$12,000 (£4,417).

References 

1995 births
English beauty pageant winners
English actresses
English female models
Living people
People from Kingston upon Hull
Love Island (2015 TV series) contestants